John "Shoes" Lesiba Moshoeu (18 December 1965 – 21 April 2015) was a South African football player who was part of the South African team that won the 1996 African Cup of Nations. He played as an attacking midfielder.

Shoes, as he was best known to fans, was born in Ga Mashashane, Limpopo and grew up in Diepkloof, Soweto.  He played for Blue Whales in Diepkloof. Kaizer Chiefs signed him to their reserve team.

Career

Giant Blackpool
He started his career in Diepkloof with an amateur team called Diepkloof Blue Wales and later recruited to join Giant Blackpool playing in the OK League R3,000.(Fani Madida) and (Geelboy Gomma Gomma Masango) joined him later at Blackpool and they made the "Triple M" combination . He helped Blackpool reach the 1991 JPS Cup Final, where he ended up on the losing side against Dynamos at Ellis Park Stadium. At Blackpool, Moshoeu scored 75 goals in 175 matches.

Kaizer Chiefs
Moshoeu chose to move to Kaizer Chiefs over Orlando Pirates for a then record fee of R250,000 after the two teams were neck and neck for his services in 1993 after having gone for trials at Wolverhampton Wanderers. His stay was short-lived as he left in mid-season having only played 14 games. Before joining Chiefs, he had been sidelined for six months with a broken leg.

In Turkey
He later signed with FIFA agent Marcelo Houseman and transferred to Turkish club Genclerbirligi after the President Ilhan Cavcav flew to Johannesburg to see him play. He also played for Kocaelispor. He joined Fenerbahce for $2 million. where he was a favourite with the fans. In his time overseas, Moshoeu was coached by Franz Beckenbauer and Joachim Löw. He won a Turkish Cup in 1996/97 while at Kocaelispor.

Kaizer Chiefs (2nd spell)
He went back to Kaizer Chiefs at age 37 where, at his vintage age, he continued to excite his old fans with the same enthusiasm and skill in 2002. His time at the club saw him play 89 games and scoring 23 goals to his name. Moshoeu played a pivotal role for Chiefs in the 2003/04 season, Moshoeu finished as Chiefs top goalscorer with 11 goals in all competitions, including two hat-tricks. The first was against Black Leopards in a 5–0 win and the second against his future club, AmaZulu in a 4–1 win.
Moshoeu assisted in ending Chiefs league title drought that had lasted 11 years. This wasn't his only title at the club. His trophy case acquired two Coca-Cola Cups (2003/04 and 2004/05), a second league title followed in the 2004/2005, and the Absa Cup in the 2005/06 season. He played at Chiefs until 2006.

AmaZulu
He played for AmaZulu until 2008 at the age of 42. He holds the record for the oldest goal scorer in the PSL when he scored for AmaZulu against Kaizer Chiefs in 2007 at the age of 41 years, 11 months and 17 days.

Later career
There were rumours that Moshoeu would make a comeback in March 2009 with Orlando Pirates or Bidvest Wits which he trained at but the deals never materialised. The attacking midfielder announced on 6 November 2010 his comeback with Brian Baloyi as owners of a South African club Alexandra United FC. In 2011/2012, Moshoeu scored 20 goals for Alex United in the Vodacom League. He called time on his career on 11 May 2014 when he resigned from the ABC Motsepe League club after following a fallout with the club's director, Nick Nicolaou. On 21 April 2015, he died of cancer.

When asked about retirement, after he turned 40, Moshoeu said, "I'm not a cheese. I don't get mouldy with age."

International career
After recovering from a broken leg and being sidelined for six months, he made his debut for South Africa on 10 January 1993 and scored on debut against Botswana with Rudolph Seale. He formed a vital part of the team that won the 1996 Africa Cup of Nations, and was second top scorer with four goals. Moshoeu later said that he broke down in tears when asked for an autograph by a white fan after the game, only two years after South Africa's first racially open elections. 

He was also part of the squad that travelled to France for the 1998 FIFA World Cup. He represented South Africa in six major tournaments. He is the oldest player to play in national colours for South Africa. His last match was against Nigeria in Monastir, Tunisia on 31 March 2004 at the age of 38 years, one month and 13 days. He accumulated 73 caps and eight goals in 68 starts.

Moshoeu was known as "Shoes" by fans, who paid homage to him and Mark Fish by bringing along shoes and fish to matches.

Personal life
Moshoeu's family history is traced back to Alexandra where his mother Reena Moshoeu resided. Moshoeu was a car enthusiast. Between 1985 and 2003, Moshoeu owned nine cars. His first was a Toyota Corolla 1.6 while during his time at Chiefs he owned a silver Porsche Boxster and a red Mini Cooper S. Moshoeu never got married and he is the father of four children, two boys, two girls.

Death
Moshoeu died on 21 April 2015 at the Morningside Hospital after a long battle with stomach cancer. Moshoeu was also admitted to the Charlotte Maxeke Hospital before his death.

Moshoeu's funeral service was held at the Grace Bible Church in Soweto and was buried at Westpark Cemetery in Randburg on 27 April 2015.

Statistics

International goals

References

External links

1965 births
2015 deaths
Sportspeople from Soweto
Africa Cup of Nations-winning players
South African soccer players
South Africa international soccer players
South African expatriate soccer players
Fenerbahçe S.K. footballers
Gençlerbirliği S.K. footballers
Giant Blackpool players
Kaizer Chiefs F.C. players
Bursaspor footballers
Kocaelispor footballers
Association football midfielders
1996 African Cup of Nations players
1998 African Cup of Nations players
1997 FIFA Confederations Cup players
1998 FIFA World Cup players
2000 African Cup of Nations players
2004 African Cup of Nations players
Süper Lig players
AmaZulu F.C. players
Expatriate footballers in Turkey
South African expatriate sportspeople in Turkey
Deaths from stomach cancer
Deaths from cancer in South Africa
Burials at Westpark Cemetery